This is a list of the member states of the Organisation internationale de la Francophonie. These countries belong to an international organisation representing countries and regions where French is the first ("mother") or customary language, where a significant proportion of the population are francophones (French speakers) or where there is a notable affiliation with French culture.

List of member states

Associate states

Observers

Other candidates
Some countries could also potentially join the Organisation internationale de la Francophonie on the basis of being part of the French colonial empire, including Algeria, Syria, Pondicherry and Chandannagar regions of India, and the U.S. state of Louisiana. In 2016, Saudi Arabia applied to join the organisation despite having no historical colonial ties with France. However, the Saudis withdrew their bid in October 2018 due to the pressure over their human rights record.

See also
 List of countries where French is an official language

References

 
Francophonie